The 2007 edition of the GP Ouest-France was held on September 2 in and around the French village of Plouay in Brittany. Several laps of a circuit were completed for a total of 226 kilometres of racing.  Although no significant breakaway was able to last, a late break by Thomas Voeckler proved decisive.  Voekler's remarkable drive kept him just ahead of the onrushing pack of sprinters two seconds later.  A native son of France and French hero of the 2004 Tour de France, Voeckler's win was very popular with the crowd.

General Classification

02-09-2007: Plouay, 226 km.

External links
Race website 

GP Ouest-France
GP Ouest-France
Bretagne Classic